Maurice Denamur (30 December 1895 – 28 December 1957) was a French racing cyclist. He rode in the 1928 Tour de France.

References

1895 births
1957 deaths
French male cyclists
Place of birth missing